Alexander Oxenford (fl. 1386–1388) was an English politician.

He was a Member (MP) of the Parliament of England for Malmesbury in 1386 and February 1388.

References

Year of birth missing
Year of death missing
English MPs 1386
Members of the Parliament of England for Malmesbury
English MPs February 1388